A weekly anime series based on ' aired on Japan's TV Asahi on Thursdays at 2:40am from October 4, 2006 to March 14, 2007. The series lasted only 26 episodes. The complete series has been released on DVD in Region 2 format by Universal Entertainment Japan, including unaired episodes and uncensored content.

The subsequent series Sōten no Ken: Re:Genesis series premiered on April 2, 2018 on Tokyo MX. The opening is "Souten no Hate ni" by AK-69 while the ending theme is "Inori no Hoshizora" by Sumire Uesaka.

Episode list

Souten no Ken

Souten no Ken Re:Genesis

References

Lists of anime episodes